Totiakton was a town of the Seneca Nation located in the present-day town of Mendon, New York. It is located "on the northernmost bend of Honeoye outlet" two miles from the current village of Honeoye Falls. The Seneca name for the town was  De-yu-di-haak-doh, meaning “the bend," because of its location at a bend of Honeoye Creek.  The archaeological remains of the site are listed on the National Register of Historic Places.

History
"The ancient town was located on the table land which projects into the west side of the valley in the form of a bold bluff, facing the east, at an elevation of about one hundred and fifty feet above the water."

In 1667 a visitor, Wentworth Greenhalgh, described the town as follows— the houses mentioned would have been the traditional Haudenosaunee longhouse:

Totiakton was the site of a French Jesuit mission, led by Father Jacques Frémin, between 1668 and 1673. The Jesuits built a small chapel dedicated to the Immaculate Conception (La Conception).

The French explorer La Salle visited the town twice, the first time in 1669, and again about ten years later.

In 1687 the Governor of New France, Marquis de Denonville, destroyed the town during his expedition against the Seneca. Previously Seneca towns had not been defended by a palisade.

In 1802 the site was purchased by Abner Sheldon, who did some exploration. In 1898 the farm was owned by Sheldon's descendant, Antoinette and her husband, William J. Kirkpatrick of Rochester, New York. In 1925 Kirkpatrick sold the property to Louis Desmann, whose family continued to farm until 1979. A large part of the property was sold to neighbors of Totiakton, but  were donated to The Seneca Nation.

See also
 Ganondagan State Historic Site

References

Iroquois populated places
Former Native American populated places in the United States
Seneca Nation of New York
Native American history of New York (state)
Monroe County, New York
Archaeological sites in New York (state)
National Register of Historic Places in Monroe County, New York
Archaeological sites on the National Register of Historic Places in New York (state)